The Criminal Justice and Police Act 2001 is an Act of the Parliament of the United Kingdom which gave extra powers to the police, with the aim to tackle crime and disorder more effectively. Key provisions include the introduction of on-the-spot penalties for disorderly behaviour, restrictions on alcohol consumption in public places and the creation of a new criminal offence for protesting outside someone's house in an intimidating manner.

The act reintroduced the ranks of deputy chief constable, deputy assistant commissioner and chief superintendent, which had been abolished by the Police Act 1996.

References

United Kingdom Acts of Parliament 2001
Criminal law of the United Kingdom
Law enforcement in the United Kingdom